False Bay College is in Cape Town, South Africa.

False Bay TVET College offers vocational, occupational and skills programmes in a range of fields: Engineering, Business, Hospitality, Information Technology, Safety in Society, Education Studies, 2D Animation, Tourism and Boat Building.

Campuses

False Bay TVET College has five campuses, serving residents in the geographical area known as the South Peninsula as well as the areas of Mitchell's Plain and Khayelitsha.

External links
Official site

Higher education in South Africa
Education in Cape Town
Educational institutions established in 2002
2002 establishments in South Africa